Seven national referendums were held in Switzerland during 2017. Polling took place on 12 February, 21 May and 24 September, whilst no referendum was scheduled for the November date.

February referendums
Three referendums were held on 12 February:
One on the federal decree of 30 September 2016, to allow easier naturalisation of third generation immigrants
One on the federal decree of 30 September 2016, to create a fund for national roads and urban infrastructure
One on the federal law of 17 June 2016, to overhaul the corporate tax code to attract and retain international firms

Results

May referendum

One referendum was held on 21 May on whether to accept the new Energy Act, establishing the Energy Strategy 2050, which seeks to phase out nuclear energy and increase renewable energy and energy efficiency. The plan was opposed by the Swiss People's Party, which launched the optional referendum against it. The Energy Act was approved by 58% of voters.

September referendums
On 24 September referendums were held on:
A Federal Decree on Food Security
A Federal Decree on Additional Funding for OASI Pensions
A Federal Act on the 2020 Pension Reforms

The latter two referendums were related, and the Federal Act on the 2020 Pension Reforms would only have gone into effect if the proposed VAT increase was also accepted by voters. The pension reform would have raised the women's retirement age to 65. The proposed reforms were supported by centre and left-of-centre parties and opposed by right-of-centre parties such as the FDP.The Liberals and the Swiss People's Party.

References

2017 in Switzerland
2017 referendums
2017
February 2017 events in Switzerland
May 2017 events in Switzerland
September 2017 events in Switzerland